The following are riders who have taken part in Grand Prix motorcycle racing and whose surnames begin with "O".

  Tadayuki Okada
  Joan Olivé

 O